The Day and the Night is an album by American jazz saxophonist Roscoe Mitchell, which was released in 1997 on the German Dizim label.

Reception
The JazzTimes review by Willard Jenkins says "There is a thoughtful, contemplative sense of quietude which marks a good portion of this disc and the dialogue between the trio is palpable."

Track listing
All compositions by Roscoe Mitchell
 "The Day and the Night" – 8:40
 "Malachi" – 9:10
 "Let's Go Out to Sea" – 5:34
 "Bessie Harris" – 6:18
 "This" – 5:08
 "Southside 60" – 6:58
 "For Lester B." – 5:43
 "Song for Atala" – 4:49

Personnel
Roscoe Mitchell - reeds, flutes, percussion
Malachi Favors – bass
Gerald Cleaver – drums, percussion

References

1997 albums
Roscoe Mitchell albums